
Dorcas is a biblical character. Dorcas may refer to:

People
Dorcas (given name), a list of people named Dorcas

Animals
Dorcas gazelle (Gazella dorcas), a species of small antelope
Belloliva dorcas, a species of sea snail
Eodorcadion dorcas, a species of beetle
Lycaena dorcas, a species of butterfly
Paratorna dorcas, a species of moth
Phyllocnistis dorcas, a species of moth
Mitromorpha dorcas, a species of sea snail

Fictional characters
Lemuel Dorcas or Doctor Dorcas, a Marvel Comics character
Dorcas, one of the brides in the movie musical Seven Brides for Seven Brothers (1954), played by Julie Newmar
Dorcas, in the video game Fire Emblem: The Blazing Blade
Dorcas, in the novel Stranger in a Strange Land
Dorcas, a teenage witch in the television series Chilling Adventures of Sabrina
Dorcas, in the science fiction cycle The Book of the New Sun

Other uses
Directorate of Research and Civil Affairs (DORCA), a World War II think tank in Australia
Dorcas Medical Mission, a 21st-century medical charity established in Brooklyn
Dorcas society, a named used for a church-based charity providing clothing to the poor
Dorcas, West Virginia, an unincorporated community, United States